Dino Mascotto (born October 25, 1932) was a Canadian professional hockey player who played in the American Hockey League for the Providence Reds. He also played for the Toledo Hornets in the International Hockey League, and for the Quebec Aces and Trois-Rivieres Lions in the Quebec Hockey League. Mascotto died 20 Dec, 2017.

References

External links
 

1932 births
Living people
Canadian ice hockey defencemen
Ice hockey people from Ontario
People from Sioux Lookout
Canadian people of Italian descent
Providence Reds players
Quebec Aces (QSHL) players
Toledo Hornets players
Trois-Rivières Lions (1955–1960) players